Harmanlı (literally "(place) with the harvest") is a Turkish place name that may refer to the following places in Turkey:

 Harmanlı, Ardanuç, a village in the district of Ardanuç, Artvin Province
 Harmanlı, Arsin, a village in the district of Arsin, Trabzon Province
 Harmanlı, Biga
 Harmanlı, Bismil
 Harmanlı, Gölbaşı, a village in the district of Gölbaşı, Adıyaman Province
 Harmanlı, Karacabey, a village in the district of Karacabey, Bursa Province
 Harmanlı, Yeşilova, a village in the district of Yeşilova, Burdur Province

See also
 Harmanli